Gertrude Scharff Goldhaber (July 14, 1911 – February 2, 1998) was a German-born Jewish-American nuclear physicist.  She earned her PhD from the University of Munich, and though her family suffered during The Holocaust, Gertrude was able to escape to London and later to the United States.  Her research during World War II was classified, and not published until 1946.  She and her husband, Maurice Goldhaber, spent most of their post-war careers at Brookhaven National Laboratory.

Early life
Gertrude Scharff was born in Mannheim, Germany on July 14, 1911. She attended public school, and it is there that she developed an interest in science. Unusual for the time, her parents supported this interest — possibly because her father had wanted to be a chemist before being forced to support his family with the death of his father. Goldhaber's early life was filled with hardship. During World War I she recalled having to eat bread made partially of sawdust, and her family suffered through the hyperinflation of postwar Germany, although it did not prevent her from attending the University of Munich.

Education
At the University of Munich Gertrude quickly developed an interest in physics. Although her family had supported her early interest in science, her father encouraged her to study law at Munich.  In defense of her decision to study physics Gertrude told her father, “I’m not interested in the law. I want to understand what the world is made of.”

As was usual for students at the time, Gertrude spent semesters at various other universities including the University of Freiburg, the University of Zurich, and the University of Berlin (where she would meet her future husband) before returning to the University of Munich. Upon returning to Munich Gertrude took up a position with Walter Gerlach to perform her thesis research. In her thesis Gertrude studied the effects of stress on magnetization. She graduated in 1935 and published her thesis in 1936.

With the rise to power of the Nazi party in 1933, Gertrude faced increasing difficulties in Germany because of her Jewish heritage. During this time her father was arrested and jailed, and although he and his wife were able to flee to Switzerland upon his release, they later returned to Germany and were murdered in The Holocaust. Gertrude remained in Germany until the completion of her Ph.D. in 1935, at which point she fled to London. Although Gertrude's parents did not escape the Nazis, her sister Liselotte did.

Career
For the first six months of her stay in London, Gertrude lived off the money she made from selling her Leica camera, as well as money earned from translating German to English. Gertrude found that having a Ph.D. was a disadvantage as there were more spots for refugee students than for refugee scientists. She wrote to 35 other refugee scientists looking for work, and was told by all but one that there were already too many refugee scientists already working. Only Maurice Goldhaber wrote back offering any hope, stating that he thought she might be able to find work in Cambridge. Gertrude was able to find work in George Paget Thomson's lab working on electron diffraction. Although she had a post-doctoral position with Thomson, Gertrude realized that she was not going to be offered a real position with him and so looked for other work.

In 1939 Gertrude married Maurice Goldhaber. She then moved to Urbana, Illinois to join him at the University of Illinois. The state of Illinois had strict anti-nepotism laws at the time which prevented Gertrude Goldhaber from being hired by the university because her husband already had a position there. Gertrude was granted neither salary nor laboratory space, and worked in Maurice's lab as an unpaid assistant. Since Maurice's lab was only set up for nuclear physics research, Gertrude Goldhaber took up research in that field as well. During this time Gertrude and Maurice Goldhaber had two sons: Alfred and Michael. Goldhaber was eventually given a soft-money line by the department to help support her research.

Goldhaber studied neutron-proton and neutron-nucleus reaction cross sections in 1941, and gamma radiation emission and absorption by nuclei in 1942. Around this time she also observed that spontaneous nuclear fission is accompanied by the release of neutrons — a result that had been theorized earlier but had yet to be shown. Her work with spontaneous nuclear fission was classified during the war, and was only published after the war ended in 1946.

Gertrude and Maurice Goldhaber moved from Illinois to Long Island where they both joined the staff of Brookhaven National Laboratory. At the laboratory she founded a series of monthly lectures known as the Brookhaven Lecture Series which is still continuing .

Honors
 1947 — elected as a fellow of the American Physical Society
 1972 — elected to National Academy of Sciences (the third female physicist to be so honored)
 1982 — Long Island Achiever’s Award in Science
 1984 — Phi Beta Kappa visiting scholar
 1990 — Outstanding Woman Scientist Award from the New York Chapter of the Association for Women Scientists

Legacy
In 2001, Brookhaven National Laboratory created the Gertrude and Maurice Goldhaber Distinguished Fellowships in her honor. These prestigious Fellowships are awarded to early-career scientists with exceptional talent and credentials who have a strong desire for independent research at the frontiers of their fields.

References

Bibliography

External Links 

 Archival papers held at the Leo Baeck Institute at the Center for Jewish History: Gertrude S. Goldhaber Collection

1911 births
1998 deaths
American nuclear physicists
Experimental physicists
American women physicists
Members of the United States National Academy of Sciences
Brookhaven National Laboratory staff
Ludwig Maximilian University of Munich alumni
20th-century German physicists
Jewish emigrants from Nazi Germany to the United States
20th-century American women scientists
Women nuclear physicists
Fellows of the American Physical Society